In integral calculus, the tangent half-angle substitution is a change of variables used for evaluating integrals, which converts a rational function of trigonometric functions of  into an ordinary rational function of  by setting . This is the one-dimensional stereographic projection of the unit circle parametrized by angle measure onto the real line. The general transformation formula is:

The tangent of half an angle is important in spherical trigonometry and was sometimes known in the 17th century as the half tangent or semi-tangent. Leonhard Euler used it to evaluate the integral  in his 1768 integral calculus textbook, and Adrien-Marie Legendre described the general method in 1817.

The substitution is described in most integral calculus textbooks since the late 19th century, usually without any special name. It is known in Russia as the universal trigonometric substitution, and also known by variant names such as half-tangent substitution or half-angle substitution. It is sometimes misattributed as the Weierstrass substitution.<ref>James Stewart mentioned Karl Weierstrass when discussing the substitution in his popular calculus textbook, first published in 1987:</p>

Later authors, citing Stewart, have sometimes referred to this as the Weierstrass substitution, for instance:

Stewart provided no evidence for the attribution to Weierstrass. A related substitution appears in Weierstrass’s Mathematical Works, from an 1875 lecture wherein Weierstrass credits Carl Gauss (1818) with the idea of solving an integral of the form  by the substitution 
</ref> Michael Spivak called it the "world's sneakiest substitution".

The substitution 

Derivation 
Using the double-angle formulas, introducing denominators equal to one thanks to the Pythagorean theorem, and then dividing numerators and denominators by  one gets

Finally, since , differentiation rules imply

and thus

Examples

Antiderivative of cosecant 

These two answers are the same because 

The secant integral may be evaluated in a similar manner.

A definite integral 

In the first line, one cannot simply substitute  for both limits of integration. Alternatively, first evaluate the indefinite integral, then apply the boundary values.

By symmetry,

which is the same as the previous answer.

Third example: both sine and cosine

if

Geometry 

As x varies, the point (cos x, sin x) winds repeatedly around the unit circle centered at (0, 0).  The point

goes only once around the circle as t goes from −∞ to +∞, and never reaches the point (−1, 0), which is approached as a limit as t approaches ±∞.  As t goes from −∞ to −1, the point determined by t goes through the part of the circle in the third quadrant, from (−1, 0) to (0, −1).  As t goes from −1 to 0, the point follows the part of the circle in the fourth quadrant from (0, −1) to (1, 0).  As t goes from 0 to 1, the point follows the part of the circle in the first quadrant from (1, 0) to (0, 1).  Finally, as t goes from 1 to +∞, the point follows the part of the circle in the second quadrant from (0, 1) to (−1, 0).

Here is another geometric point of view.  Draw the unit circle, and let P be the point .  A line through P (except the vertical line) is determined by its slope.  Furthermore, each of the lines (except the vertical line) intersects the unit circle in exactly two points, one of which is P.  This determines a function from points on the unit circle to slopes.  The trigonometric functions determine a function from angles to points on the unit circle, and by combining these two functions we have a function from angles to slopes.

Gallery

Hyperbolic functions

As with other properties shared between the trigonometric functions and the hyperbolic functions, it is possible to use hyperbolic identities to construct a similar form of the substitution, :

Geometrically, this change of variables is a one-dimensional analog of the Poincaré disk projection.

See also

Rational curve
Stereographic projection
Tangent half-angle formula
Trigonometric substitution
Euler substitution

Further reading 

 

 

  Second edition 1916, pp. 52–62

Notes and references

External links 
 Weierstrass substitution formulas at PlanetMath

Integral calculus